Camilla Tominey (born 14 June 1978) is a British journalist and broadcaster. She reports on politics and the British royal family as an associate editor of The Daily Telegraph. She also writes a weekly column for the newspaper. Since January 2023, she has presented The Camilla Tominey Show, a Sunday morning politics show on GB News.

Early life
Tominey was born on 14 June 1978. Her father was a Catholic and worked as a general practitioner, running the local practice. Her mother Lynne (1941–2001) was a housewife. Tominey has two older brothers. She was brought up in Harpenden, Hertfordshire, and educated at Roundwood JMI School, followed by the independent St Albans High School for Girls from the age of seven. Her parents divorced and she went to live with her mother. Tominey has commented that her mother suffered from alcoholism and that "there was a degree [...] of physical and mental abuse" with regard to her period living with her. Tominey later moved back to live with her father and brothers. She studied law at the University of Leeds. She has said that she never planned to be a royal reporter, but did aspire to be a journalist.

Career
Tominey was offered a traineeship at the Hemel Hempstead Gazette by the then editor. Within two years at the newspaper she had qualified as a senior journalist. After contacting the Sunday Express and asking for shifts, she left the Hemel Hempstead Gazette and joined the Sunday Express. She was offered the opportunity to report on the British royal family by Sunday Express editor Martin Townsend. She began her career as a royal reporter in 2005 when she covered the wedding of Prince Charles and Camilla Parker Bowles.

At the Sunday Express she worked in several roles concurrently, firstly as royal editor and deputy political editor, and then as royal editor, political editor and a columnist. She joined NBC News in 2010 and co-hosted its coverage of the wedding of Prince William and Catherine Middleton from outside Buckingham Palace alongside Meredith Vieira, Matt Lauer, Andrew Roberts and Martin Bashir. Tominey's scoops have included her 2013 report of Prince Andrew being held at gunpoint by guards at Buckingham Palace. She broke the news of Prince Harry's relationship with Meghan Markle in an article in the Sunday Express on 31 October 2016. The article was nominated for the Scoop of the Year award at the British Press Awards. Tominey covered Prince Harry and Markle's wedding, again for NBC News. 

Tominey was hired by The Telegraph to cover politics and the royal family as an associate editor. She has been described as holding pro-Brexit views. Her report that "Meghan [had] made Kate cry" in a dispute over flower girl dresses was disputed by Meghan in an interview. In 2021 Tominey opened up about receiving hate mail and online abuse for her work as a journalist. On 1 May 2021 she began writing a weekly Telegraph column. In June 2021, after misquoting Meghan on a TV programme, she received abuse on Twitter and via email, which resulted in Twitter and the police taking action.

On 1 July 2021 it was announced that Tominey would commence a Sunday afternoon show on call-in radio station LBC. The show, which ran from 4 pm to 7 pm, began on 4 July. On 18 August 2022 it was reported that she would leave LBC and join GB News as a political presenter.

Tominey is a patron of the National Association for Children of Alcoholics and the Peace Hospice. She is a contributor to ITV's This Morning, and has appeared on the BBC's Any Questions? and Question Time.

Personal life
Tominey married Dominic, a commercial manager, in 2005. She lives in St Albans, Hertfordshire, with her husband, two daughters and a son. She is a teetotaller.

In 2021, she revealed she had suffered a miscarriage.

References

External links
 Official website
 Camilla Tominey at The Telegraph

1978 births
Living people
21st-century British journalists
Alumni of the University of Leeds
British newspaper journalists
British political journalists
British radio presenters
British women columnists
British women journalists
British women radio presenters
GB News newsreaders and journalists
LBC radio presenters
NBC News people
People educated at St Albans High School for Girls
People from Harpenden
The Daily Telegraph people